Ramachandra Achar from the Carleton University, Ottawa, ON, Canada was named Fellow of the Institute of Electrical and Electronics Engineers (IEEE) in 2013 for contributions to interconnect and signal integrity analysis in high-speed designs.

References 

Fellow Members of the IEEE
Living people
Academic staff of Carleton University
21st-century American engineers
Year of birth missing (living people)